The Andrew McCarron Three-Decker is a historic triple-decker house in Worcester, Massachusetts.  Built c. 1918, it is a well-preserved example of a Colonial Revival triple-decker, and rare for its relatively large size and proportioning.  It follows a standard side hall plan, but is four bays wide instead of the more usual three, and has no side jogs (protruding bays on the side elevation).  It has a three-story porch structure that projects significantly from the front facade. It is supported by fluted square columns and is topped by a pedimented gable.

The house was listed on the National Register of Historic Places in 1990.

See also
National Register of Historic Places listings in southwestern Worcester, Massachusetts
National Register of Historic Places listings in Worcester County, Massachusetts

References

Apartment buildings on the National Register of Historic Places in Massachusetts
Colonial Revival architecture in Massachusetts
Houses completed in 1918
Apartment buildings in Worcester, Massachusetts
National Register of Historic Places in Worcester, Massachusetts